Euchirinae is a subfamily of Scarabaeidae or scarab beetles in the superfamily Scarabaeoidea. They are sometimes referred to as "long-armed scarabs" due to the elongated forelegs of the males. These long legs often have median and apical spines that are fixed in the male while females have a movable terminal spine.

They are sometimes included in Subfamily Melolonthinae as Tribe Euchirini.

Genera and species 
This subfamily contains 3 genera with 16 species:
 Cheirotonus Hope, 1840 (10 species)
 Cheirotonus battareli Pouillaude, 1913
 Cheirotonus formosanus Ohaus, 1913
 Cheirotonus fujiokai Muramoto, 1994
 Cheirotonus gestroi Pouillaude, 1913
 Cheirotonus jambar Kurosawa, 1984
 Cheirotonus jansoni Jordan, 1898
 Cheirotonus macleayi Hope, 1840
 Cheirotonus parryi Gray, 1848
 Cheirotonus peracanus Kriesche, 1919
 Cheirotonus szetshuanus Medvedev, 1960
 Propomacrus Newman, 1837 (4 species)
 Propomacrus bimucronatus Pallas, 1781
 Propomacrus cypriacus Alexis & Makris 2002
 Propomacrus davidi Deyrolle, 1874
 Propomacrus muramotoae Fujioka, 2007
 Euchirus Linnaeus, 1758 (2 species)
 Euchirus dupontianus Burmeister, 1841
 Euchirus longimanus Linnaeus, 1758

One fossil species C. otai has been described from Japan.

References

External links 
 www.goliathus.cz

Scarabaeidae